Berthrand Okafor (born 4 January 1990) is a Finnish-Nigerian footballer. He currently plays for Aseman Pallo, on loan from Atlantis FC.

Career
In January 2008, Okafor along with his teammate Kelechukwu Nnajiofor moved  from AsPa to Atlantis FC. In December 2008, Okafor left the team on loan to ECO F.C. Lagos and returned in April 2010 to Atlantis FC. After one month with Atlantis FC, he was loaned out to his first Finnish club, Aseman Pallo.

References

1990 births
Living people
Finnish footballers
Atlantis FC players
Expatriate footballers in Finland
Nigerian footballers
Nigerian expatriates in Finland
Association football defenders